Jun Fan Jeet Kune Do: A crystallization and standadization of Jeet Kune Do established by the Lee Estate in the 1990s. Jun Fan Jeet Kune Do practices a greater emphasis on kickboxing, grappling, and effective trapping unique to Lee's later approach to combat and encourages the student to further develop his or her abilities through these teachings. The focus is with Wing Chun, Western Boxing, and Épée Fencing. 

Jeet Kune Do